Inés Arrondo (born 28 November 1977) is a retired field hockey player from Argentina, who won the silver medal with the national women's hockey team at the 2000 Summer Olympics in Sydney and a bronze medal at the 2004 Summer Olympics in Athens. Inés has also won the World Cup in 2002 and the Champions Trophy in 2001.

Having retired from her sporting career, she entered politics in 2017 when she ran for a seat in the Buenos Aires Province Senate in the Justicialist Front list, led by Florencio Randazzo. She failed to win a seat. Since 2019, she has been Secretary of Sports in Argentina's Ministry of Tourism and Sports, working alongside minister Matías Lammens. She is the first woman to hold the post.

References

External links
 
 Website with more information
 Inés Arrondo portrait

1977 births
Living people
Argentine female field hockey players
Argentine sportsperson-politicians
Las Leonas players
Olympic field hockey players of Argentina
Sportspeople from Mar del Plata
Field hockey players at the 2000 Summer Olympics
Field hockey players at the 2004 Summer Olympics
Olympic silver medalists for Argentina
Olympic bronze medalists for Argentina
Olympic medalists in field hockey
Medalists at the 2000 Summer Olympics
Medalists at the 2004 Summer Olympics
Pan American Games gold medalists for Argentina
Pan American Games medalists in field hockey
Field hockey players at the 1999 Pan American Games
Medalists at the 1999 Pan American Games